A member of Ascension Health, the USA’s largest not-for-profit and Catholic Healthcare System,  St. Vincent Health contains 18 health ministries serving 45 counties in Indiana.

Facilities

Reducing disparities
In 2001, St. Vincent Health implemented a program known as Rural and Urban Access to Health to enhance access to care for underserved populations, including Hispanic migrant workers. As of December 2012, the program had facilitated more than 78,000 referrals to care and enabled the distribution of $43.7 million worth of free or reduced-cost prescription drugs.

Notes

External links

 

Companies based in Indiana
Healthcare in Indiana
Catholic hospital networks in the United States
Catholic health care